The Heroes (also known as Gli eroi, Les héros and Los héroes millonarios) is a 1973 Italian war-comedy film directed by Duccio Tessari.

Cast 
Rod Steiger as Guenther von Lutz
Rosanna Schiaffino as Katrin 
Rod Taylor as Bob Robson 
Claude Brasseur as Raphael Tilbaudet
Terry-Thomas as John Cooper
Gianni Garko as Schreiber
Aldo Giuffrè as Spartaco Amore
Ángel Aranda as Cowlich
Nino Segurini as German soldier
Miguel Bosé as German soldier
Antonio Pica as Dietrich
Lucia Bosé (cameo)

Production
Yul Brynner was announced to play the lead but pulled out.

Part of the film production was done in the Egyptian Western Desert, several miles near the pyramid of Mydoom. A small Carson City, Nevada was built with river Nile mud on a woven reed and palm baskets but looked authentic from a distance. The city was full scale at the entrance but half-scale behind it.

References

External links

1973 films
Italian war comedy films
1970s war comedy films
1970s Italian-language films
Films directed by Duccio Tessari
Macaroni Combat films
Films scored by Riz Ortolani
Films shot in Almería
Films shot in Egypt
1973 comedy films
Films with screenplays by Sergio Donati
Films with screenplays by Luciano Vincenzoni
French World War II films
Italian World War II films
1973 war films
1970s Italian films
1970s French films